Thaddis Bosley Jr. (born September 17, 1956) is an American former professional baseball outfielder for the California Angels, Chicago White Sox (–), Milwaukee Brewers, Seattle Mariners, Chicago Cubs (–), Kansas City Royals (–1988) and Texas Rangers (–).

Playing career
Bosley was called up to the Angels after hitting .326 in 69 games for the Salt Lake City Gulls of the Pacific Coast League (PCL), and made his Major League debut on June 29, . He was traded along with Bobby Bonds and Richard Dotson to the White Sox for Brian Downing, Chris Knapp  and Dave Frost on December 5, 1977. He remained with the White Sox organization for three years and later played for the Milwaukee Brewers, Seattle Mariners, and Chicago Cubs, distinguishing himself as one of the best pinch hitters in the majors. During the 1985 season, Bosley hit .328 and was voted the best pinch hitter in baseball. After being traded to the Kansas City Royals in 1987, Bosley returned again to the California Angels in 1988. In 1989, he signed with the Texas Rangers and ended his playing career on June 1, 1990.

He appeared with two division champions, the  Brewers and the  Cubs. Both teams lost their respective League Championship Series, however, so Bosley never played in a World Series. Bosley played fourteen major-league seasons, appearing in 784 games with 1,581 at-bats, a .272 batting average and twenty home runs.

Coaching career
Bosley was a coach for the Oakland Athletics from 1999 to 2002. During the 2008 and 2009 seasons Bosley served as an assistant coach and then as the head coach for the baseball team at the now defunct Bethany University in Scotts Valley, California. Bosley was announced on June 24, 2009, as the head coach at Southwestern College in Phoenix, Arizona. After one season at Southwestern, Bosley accepted the hitting coach vacancy for the most recent American League champion, the Texas Rangers on November 23, 2010. He was fired as the Rangers hitting coach on June 8, 2011.

Personal life
Bosley was briefly a member of a funk group called Ballplayers which featured former Major League Baseball journeyman Lenny Randle. Some of their music can be heard on a compilation called "Family Album", which was released in 2010 on the DC-based music label, People's Potential Family.

References

External links

Retrosheet
Pitchfork

1956 births
Living people
African-American baseball coaches
African-American baseball players
American expatriate baseball players in Canada
Baseball coaches from California
Baseball players from California
California Angels players
Chicago Cubs players
Chicago White Sox players
Edmonton Trappers players
Idaho Falls Angels players
Iowa Cubs players
Iowa Oaks players
Kansas City Royals players
Major League Baseball first base coaches
Major League Baseball hitting coaches
Major League Baseball outfielders
Milwaukee Brewers players
Oakland Athletics coaches
Oklahoma City 89ers players
Quad Cities Angels players
Salinas Angels players
Salt Lake City Gulls players
Seattle Mariners players
Sportspeople from Oceanside, California
Texas Rangers coaches
Texas Rangers players
Vancouver Canadians players
21st-century African-American people
20th-century African-American sportspeople